The Shanghai Outer Ring Expressway, designated S20, is a ring expressway that surrounds the inner districts of the city of Shanghai, China.

The different sections of the road have specific names in relation to the cardinal directions. For instance, the eastern portion of the expressway is named 上海环东一大道 (Huandong Avenue (No. 1), literally Eastern Ring No. 1 Avenue), the western portion of the expressway is named 上海环西一大道 (Huanxi Avenue (No. 1), literally Western Ring No. 1 Avenue), and so on.

The S20 expressway crosses the Huangpu River twice. At the southern end, it uses the Xupu Bridge, and at the northern end, it uses the Outer Ring Tunnel.

See also
 Inner Ring Road (Shanghai): A ring road in downtown of Shanghai
 Middle Ring Road (Shanghai): Another ring road in Shanghai, located between the inner ring and the outer one.

Ring roads in China
Expressways in Shanghai